Paul Moran (born 10 May 1983) is an English former professional ice hockey player.  He played in the Elite Ice Hockey League for the Nottingham Panthers, Sheffield Steelers, Belfast Giants and Hull Stingrays.  He also played for the Great Britain national ice hockey team.

External links

1983 births
Living people
Belfast Giants players
English ice hockey defencemen
Hull Stingrays players
Nottingham Lions players
Nottingham Panthers players
Sheffield Steelers players
Sportspeople from Nottingham